Leonid Vitalyevich Kantorovich (19 January 19127 April 1986) was a Soviet mathematician and economist, known for his theory and development of techniques for the optimal allocation of resources. He is regarded as the founder of linear programming. He was the winner of the Stalin Prize in 1949 and the Nobel Memorial Prize in Economic Sciences in 1975.

Biography 
Kantorovich was born on 19 January 1912, to a Russian Jewish family. His father was a doctor practicing in Saint Petersburg. In 1926, at the age of fourteen, he began his studies at Leningrad State University. He graduated from the Faculty of Mathematics and Mechanics in 1930, and began his graduate studies. In 1934, at the age of 22 years, he became a full professor.

Later, Kantorovich worked for the Soviet government. He was given the task of optimizing production in a plywood industry. He devised the mathematical technique now known as linear programming in 1939, some years before it was advanced by George Dantzig. He authored several books including The Mathematical Method of Production Planning and Organization (Russian original 1939), The Best Uses of Economic Resources (Russian original 1959), and, with Vladimir Ivanovich Krylov, Approximate methods of higher analysis (Russian original 1936). For his work, Kantorovich was awarded the Stalin Prize in 1949.

After 1939, he became a professor at Military Engineering-Technical University. During the Siege of Leningrad, Kantorovich was a professor at VITU of Navy and worked on safety of the Road of Life. He calculated the optimal distance between cars on ice in dependence of the thickness of ice and the temperature of the air. In December 1941 and January 1942, Kantorovich walked himself between cars driving on the ice of Lake Ladoga on the Road of Life to ensure that cars did not sink. However, many cars with food for survivors of the siege were destroyed by the German airstrikes. For his feat and courage Kantorovich was awarded the Order of the Patriotic War, and was decorated with the medal For Defense of Leningrad. 

In 1948 Kantorovich was assigned to the atomic project of the USSR.

After 1960, Kantorovich lived and worked in Novosibirsk, where he created and took charge of the Department of Computational Mathematics in Novosibirsk State University.

The Nobel Memorial Prize, which he shared with Tjalling Koopmans, was given "for their contributions to the theory of optimum allocation of resources."

Mathematics
In mathematical analysis, Kantorovich had important results in functional analysis, approximation theory, and operator theory.

In particular, Kantorovich formulated some fundamental results in the theory of normed vector lattices, especially in Dedekind complete vector lattices called "K-spaces" which are now referred to as "Kantorovich spaces" in his honor.

Kantorovich showed that functional analysis could be used in the analysis of iterative methods, obtaining the Kantorovich inequalities on the convergence rate of the gradient method and of Newton's method (see the Kantorovich theorem).

Kantorovich considered infinite-dimensional optimization problems, such as the Kantorovich-Monge problem in transport theory. His analysis proposed the Kantorovich-Rubinstein metric, which is used in probability theory, in the theory of the weak convergence of probability measures.

See also
 List of Russian mathematicians
 List of economists
 Shadow price

Notes

References
 
 
 Kantorovich, L.V. (1959). "The Best Use of Economic Resources"(). Pergamon Press, 1965.
 Klaus Hagendorf (2008). Spreadsheet presenting all examples of Kantorovich, 1939 with the OpenOffice.org Calc Solver as well as the lp_solver.

Nobel prize lecture
 Kantorovich, Leonid, "Mathematics in Economics: Achievements, Difficulties, Perspectives", Nobel Prize lecture, December 11, 1975
 "Autobiography: Leonid Kantorovich", Nobel Prize website

Further reading 
 Dantzig, George, Linear programming and extensions. Princeton University Press and the RAND Corporation, 1963. Cf. p.22 for the work of Kantorovich.
 Isbell, J.R.; Marlow, W.H., "On an Industrial Programming Problem of Kantorovich", Management Science, Vol. 8, No. 1 (Oct., 1961), pp. 13–17
 
 Koopmans, Tjalling C., "Concepts of optimality and their uses", Nobel Memorial Lecture, December 11, 1975
 Kutateladze, S.S., "The World Line of Kantorovich", Notices of the ISMS, International Society for Mathematical Sciences, Osaka, Japan, January 2007
 Kutateladze, S.S., "Kantorovich's Phenomenon", Siberian Math. J. (Сибирский мат. журн.), 2007, V. 48, No. 1, 3–4, November 29, 2006.
 Kutateladze, S.S., "Mathematics and Economics of Kantorovich"
 Kutateladze, S.S., "My Kantorovich"
 
 
 
 Ivan Boldyrev and Till Düppe, Programming the USSR: Leonid V. Kantorovich in context, The British Journal for the History of Science. 2020. 53(2): 255-278.
 
  Kutateladze, S.S., et al., "Leonid V. Kantorovich (1912–1986)", Sobolev Institute of Mathematics of the Siberian Division of the Russian Academy of Sciences. Also published in the Siberian Mathematical Journal, Volume 43 (2002), No. 1, pp. 3–8
  Vershik, Anatoly, "On Leonid Kantorovich and linear programming"

External links

 
  (With additional photos.)
 Information about: Leonid Vitaliyevich Kantorovich – IDEAS/RePEc
 
 Biography Leonid Kantorovich from the Institute for Operations Research and the Management Sciences
Biographical documentary about L.Kantorovich by Rossiya-Culture
 
 

1912 births
1986 deaths
20th-century Russian economists
20th-century Russian mathematicians
Mathematicians from Saint Petersburg
People from Sankt-Peterburgsky Uyezd
Fellows of the Econometric Society
Full Members of the USSR Academy of Sciences
Academic staff of Military Engineering-Technical University
Academic staff of Novosibirsk State University
Saint Petersburg State University alumni
Academic staff of Saint Petersburg State University
Nobel laureates in Economics
Stalin Prize winners
Lenin Prize winners
Recipients of the Order of Lenin
Recipients of the Order of the Red Banner of Labour
Approximation theorists
Functional analysts
General equilibrium theorists
Mathematical economists
Operations researchers
Operator theorists
Variational analysts
Russian economists
Russian Jews
Russian mathematicians
Soviet economists
Soviet Jews
Soviet mathematicians
Soviet Nobel laureates
Burials at Novodevichy Cemetery